Russell W. Teig (born April 11, 1957) is an American politician in the state of Iowa.

Teig was born in Webster City, Iowa and attended the Iowa State University. A Republican, he served in the Iowa House of Representatives from 1995 to 2003 (17th district)

References

1957 births
Living people
People from Hamilton County, Iowa
Iowa State University alumni
Republican Party members of the Iowa House of Representatives